Bartosz Domański (born 25 August 1980) is a Polish former competitive figure skater. He is the 2002 and 2003 Polish national champion. He competed twice at the European Figure Skating Championships and three times at the World Junior Figure Skating Championships. He and Sabina Wojtala used to coach each other.

He is not related to Przemysław Domański.

Programs

Competitive highlights 
JGP: Junior Series / Junior Grand Prix

References

External links
 
The Figure Skating Corner
Planete Patinage

1980 births
Living people
Polish male single skaters
Sportspeople from Opole
Competitors at the 2001 Winter Universiade